Ethan Wesley Willie (born 21 February 1999) is a Bahamian footballer who plays for Western Warriors SC and the Bahamas national football team.

International career
Willie made his senior international debut for the Bahamas on 18 November 2018 in a 1–1 home draw with Anguilla.

References

External links

Profile at Wofford Athletics

1999 births
Living people
Bahamian footballers
Bahamas international footballers
Association football midfielders
Wofford Terriers men's soccer players
Sportspeople from Nassau, Bahamas
Bahamas youth international footballers